Johnson Township is one of ten townships in Gibson County, Indiana. As of the 2010 census, its population was 4,094 and it contained 1,605 housing units.

Johnson Township was organized in 1823.

Geography

Cities and towns
 Haubstadt

Unincorporated towns
 Saint James
 Warrenton

Adjacent townships
Gibson County
 Union Township (north)
 Barton Township (east)
 Montgomery Township (northwest)
Posey County
 Smith Township (west)
Vanderburgh County
 Armstrong Township (southwest)
 Scott Township (southeast)
Warrick County
 Greer Township (east)

Cemeteries
The township contains four cemeteries: Nobles, Powell, Stunkel, Tabor and Williams.

Major highways

Education
Johnson Township is served by the South Gibson School Corporation.

Public Schools
 Haubstadt Community School

Private Schools
 Saint James Catholic School - St. James
 Saints Peter and Paul Catholic School - Haubstadt

References
 
 United States Census Bureau cartographic boundary files

External links
 Indiana Township Association
 United Township Association of Indiana

Townships in Gibson County, Indiana
Townships in Indiana